Fatty Joins the Force is a 1913 American short comedy film featuring Fatty Arbuckle. It features the Keystone Kops in a background role.

Plot
Fatty is an obese and timid man who is walking in the park with his girlfriend. A handsome policeman passes and the girl is attracted. The policeman joins a young lady and a girl on a bench. The girl gets up and walks along the stones edging a pond and falls in. Fatty's girlfriend forces him to help and pushes him into the pond. He reluctantly rescues the little girl from drowning.

The rescued girl is the daughter of the Police Commissioner. The grateful Commissioner offers Fatty a job on the Police Force. Fatty's girlfriend thinks this is a good idea so Fatty accepts.

At Police Headquarters the Commissioner introduces Fatty to the Keystone Cops. He is given a police uniform and the cops salute him before he goes out on his first beat.

His girlfriend takes his arm as they walk down an avenue. They encounter two men brawling. He takes his truncheon out and stands between the men. They hit him and knock him over then run off.

He sits on a park bench with his girlfriend but five boys having a picnic start throwing food at him. One creeps up behind him then pushes a large treacle tart into his face. The boys run off. Fatty decides to have a bath in the pond and strips to his underwear, leaving his uniform hanging on a bush. The boys rematerialise and cut up his trousers and steal his jacket and throw it into the reeds. Fatty puts on the torn trousers. A stranger finds his police jacket and takes it to Police Headquarters. The police conclude that Fatty has drowned. Back in the park Fatty scares two women with his odd attire and they run to fetch two policemen. Meanwhile his policeman friends are dragging the pond to look for his body, with his hysterical girlfriend at the edge. Fatty hides in the bushes.

At the pond the police boat sinks. The police headquarters goes into mourning but the other two policemen are dragging Fatty back. Fatty salutes the police chief and turns to hug his girlfriend but she shuns him.

Fatty is put behind bars and the girlfriend finds solace in the arms of the police chief.

Cast
 Roscoe 'Fatty' Arbuckle as Fatty
 Dot Farley as Fatty's wife
 Minta Durfee as Nursemaid
 Edgar Kennedy as Policeman in the park
 George Nichols as Police Commissioner
 William White as Police Captain
 Charles Avery as Desk Sergeant
 Mack Swain as Policeman

See also
 Fatty Arbuckle filmography

References

External links
 
 Fatty Joins the Force  on YouTube
 
 

1913 films
Silent American comedy films
1913 comedy films
1913 short films
American silent short films
American black-and-white films
Keystone Studios films
Films directed by George Nichols
Films produced by Mack Sennett
American comedy short films
1910s American films
1910s English-language films